Washio ( characters for "eagle" and "tail") is a Japanese surname.

People named Washio include:
Eiichiro Washio(鷲尾英一郎),politician of the Democratic Party of Japan
Haruka Washio(鷲尾春果), fashion model
Isako Washio(鷲尾いさ子), actress
Kazuhiko Washio(鷲尾和彦), photographer
Machiko Washio(鷲尾真知子), voice actress and actress
Mie Washio(鷲尾美枝), manga artist
Uko Washio(鷲尾雨工), novelist

See also
Washinoo family(鷲尾家), Kuge family